CACTUS (Converted Atmospheric Cherenkov Telescope Using Solar-2) was a ground-based, Air Cherenkov Telescope (ACT) located outside Daggett, California, near Barstow.  It was originally a solar power plant called Solar Two, but was converted to an observatory starting in 2001. The first astronomical observations started in the fall of 2004.  However, the facility had its last observing runs in November 2005 as funds for observational operations from the National Science Foundation were no longer available.  The facility was operated by the University of California, Davis but owned by Southern California Edison.
It was demolished in 2009.

See also 
 Air shower (physics)
 Čerenkov radiation
 Gamma-ray astronomy - provides some history of high energy astronomy.
 IACT
 The Solar Project - the physical facility that preceded C.A.C.T.U.S. in Daggett.
 STACEE
 Ultra-high-energy cosmic ray

References

External links 

 Solar One Power Tower Demolition
 Google Satellite Image
 The former power plant/observatory is located at 

Buildings and structures in San Bernardino County, California
High energy particle telescopes
Gamma-ray telescopes